Mark Howard (born 9 January 1965) is a British racing driver who competed in the British Touring Car Championship in 2016, after winning the Renault Clio Cup United Kingdom Masters title in 2015.

Racing career
Howard began his career in the Renault 5 ELF Turbo UK Cup, which he won in 1993. He then had an 18-year hiatus from racing until 2011 when he returned to racing in the Volkswagen Racing Cup. He went on to finish 9th in the championship standings that season. He switched to the Renault Clio Cup United Kingdom championship in 2014, he finished 12th in the championship that year. He went on to win the Clio Cup Masters title in 2015, finishing 13th in the overall standings. In March 2016, it was announced that Howard would make his British Touring Car Championship debut with the debuting Team BKR driving a Volkswagen CC.

Racing record

Complete British Touring Car Championship results
(key) (Races in bold indicate pole position – 1 point awarded just in first race; races in italics indicate fastest lap – 1 point awarded all races; * signifies that driver led race for at least one lap – 1 point given all races)

References

External links
 
 
 

1965 births
Living people
British Touring Car Championship drivers
English racing drivers
British racing drivers
Renault UK Clio Cup drivers